The following is a list of FCC-licensed radio stations in the U.S. state of Wyoming, which can be sorted by their call signs, frequencies, cities of license, licensees, and programming formats.

List of radio stations

Defunct 
 KATI
 KNIE

References 

 
Radio stations
Wyoming